Sospiro is a comune (municipality) in the Province of Cremona in the Italian region Lombardy, located about  southeast of Milan and about  southeast of Cremona.   

Sospiro borders the following municipalities: Cella Dati, Malagnino, Pieve d'Olmi, Pieve San Giacomo, San Daniele Po, Vescovato.

References

Cities and towns in Lombardy